Jabbour is both a surname and a given name. Notable people with the name include:

Surname:
Alan Jabbour (1942–2017), American musician and folklorist
Brahim Jabbour (born 1970), Moroccan long-distance runner
Gabriel Jabbour (1922–1987), French actor
Nabeel Jabbour (born 1941), American academic and writer
Zeke Jabbour, American bridge player

Given name:
Jabbour Douaihy (1949–2021), Lebanese writer